Vladimir Krutskikh (born 24 April 1973) is a Russian sailor. He competed at the 2000 Summer Olympics and the 2004 Summer Olympics.

References

External links
 

1973 births
Living people
Russian male sailors (sport)
Olympic sailors of Russia
Sailors at the 2000 Summer Olympics – Laser
Sailors at the 2004 Summer Olympics – Finn
Place of birth missing (living people)